Prince Svasti Sobhana, the Prince Svastivatana Visishtha (22 December 1865 – 10 December 1935) was a son of King Mongkut (Rama IV) and Princess Consort Piam. He had the same parents as the 3 queens of King Chulalongkorn, Queen Sunandha Kumariratana, Queen Savang Vadhana and Queen Saovabha Bhongsi. He was the father of Queen Rambai Barni. Prince Svasti Sobhana was the sixtieth child of King Mongkut.

Honours 
  Grand Cross of the Order of the Dannebrog, 31 July 1894 (Denmark)
  Grand Cordon of the Royal Order of Leopold, 1897 (Belgium)
  Grand Cross of the Royal Hungarian Order of St. Stephen, 1897 (Austria-Hungary)
  Knight of the Royal Order of the Seraphim, 14 July 1897 (Sweden-Norway)
  Knight of the Order of the Elephant, 25 July 1897 (Denmark)
  Grand Cross of the Albert Order, with Golden Star, 1897 (Kingdom of Saxony)
  Grand Cross of the Order of the Crown of Italy, 1898 (Kingdom of Italy)

Ancestors

Notes

References

|-

Svastivatana family
19th-century Chakri dynasty
20th-century Chakri dynasty
Thai male Phra Ong Chao
Children of Mongkut
People from Bangkok
1865 births
1935 deaths
Thai people of Mon descent
Grand Crosses of the Order of Saint Stephen of Hungary
Grand Crosses of the Order of the Dannebrog
Recipients of the Order of the Crown (Italy)
Presidents of the Supreme Court of Thailand
Ministers of Justice of Thailand
Members of the Privy Council of Thailand
Sons of kings